Schwimmverein Bayer Uerdingen 08 e.V. is a German water polo and swimming club from the Uerdingen district of Krefeld.

Bayer Uerdingen men's team won the Wasserball-Liga in 1926, while its women's team won its first championship in 1994. In 2007 the latter won the national cup, and between 2006 and 2011 it was the championship runner-up (second to Blau-Weiss Bochum) on five occasions, earning a spot in the European Cup.

Titles
 Women
 Wasserball-Liga
 1994
 Wasserball-Pokal
 2007
 Men
 Wasserball-Liga
 1926

References

Water polo clubs in Germany
Sport in North Rhine-Westphalia
LEN Women's Champions' Cup clubs